Roman Dmitriyevich Protasevich (born 5 May 1995), or Raman Dzmitryyevich Pratasyevich, is a Belarusian blogger and political activist. He was the editor-in-chief of the Telegram channel Nexta and chief editor of the Telegram channel "Belarus of the Brain". Protasevich was arrested by Belarusian authorities after his flight, Ryanair Flight 4978, was diverted to Minsk on the orders of Belarusian president Alexander Lukashenko on 23 May 2021, because of a false bomb threat passed on by Belarusian air traffic control.

Personal life
Protasevich was born on 5 May 1995 in Minsk, Belarus. He moved to Poland in 2019.

Protasevich's father Dmitry is a Belarusian army reserve officer and a lecturer at a Belarusian military academy. He was stripped of his military rank and awards by a personal decree of President Alexander Lukashenko on 6 May 2021. Protasevich's parents moved to join their son in Poland in August 2020.

Protasevich was in a relationship with Sofia Sapega, a Russian citizen, who was also detained by Belarusian authorities on 23 May 2021. According to Sapega's mother, she and Protasevich had known each other for about six months prior to his arrest in May 2021. Sapega was born in Vladivostok, Russia, but has spent most of her life in Belarus. At the time of her arrest, she was an international law student at the European Humanities University in Vilnius.

Career

Opposition activism and work in Belarus (2011–2019) 
Protasevich has been an opposition activist and participated in protests since the early 2010s, when he was detained several times.

Since 2011, he has been a member of the Young Front opposition organization. He co-administered a major group in VKontakte, a social network, in opposition to President Alexander Lukashenko until 2012, when it was hacked by the authorities. For a month he took part in the Euromaidan protests.

Protasevich studied journalism at Belarusian State University until he was expelled in 2018. In 2017, he was accused of participating in an unauthorized event in Kurapaty, but he proved in court that he had an alibi for that day. In an interview, he said he was a reporter for several major Belarusian media for several years. He also worked for Radio Free Europe/Radio Liberty's Belarus channel from 2017 to 2018.  He had been a Václav Havel Fellow in Journalism in Prague, co-sponsored by the broadcaster.

In March 2019, Protasevich was a photographer for Euroradio.fm at the meeting of prime ministers of Austria (Sebastian Kurz) and Belarus (Sergey Rumas) in Minsk. In addition to taking photos, he made at least one video report for Euroradio about Chechen refugees trying to move to the EU through Belarus.

Opposition activism in exile (2019–2021) 
In 2019, Protasevich moved to Poland and on 22 January 2020, announced that he had asked for political asylum there.

In 2020, Protasevich ran the Nexta Telegram channel together with its creator Stsiapan Putsila. In August 2020, after Belarusian authorities tried to disable internet access during the 2020 presidential election, Nexta became one of the main sources of information about the protests against alleged rigged elections and started to coordinate the protests. The channel had gotten nearly 800,000 new subscribers within a week. In September 2020 Protasevich left Nexta.

On 5 November 2020, Protasevich and Putsila were accused of organizing mass riots (article 293 of the Belarusian criminal code), actions that grossly violate public order (article 342) and incitement of social enmity based on professional affiliation (article 130, part 3). On 19 November, the Belarusian KGB put them on the "list of organizations and individuals involved in terrorist activities" for "mass unrest".

On 2 March 2021, Protasevich announced that he had begun working for the "Belarus of the Brain" Telegram channel formerly edited by a detained blogger, Ihar Losik.

Arrests

Ryanair Flight 4978

On 23 May 2021, Ryanair Flight 4978 (Athens–Vilnius), with Protasevich on board, received a false bomb threat and was diverted by Belarusian air traffic control to Minsk National Airport. While in Athens, Protasevich sent messages through Telegram saying he had seen a bald man at the airport following him and taking photographs of him. Minsk airport staff said they landed the plane due to a report of a bomb aboard. Lithuanian airport authorities stated that they had not been informed of a bomb threat. The plane changed course just before it would have entered Lithuanian airspace. According to a witness cited by Reuters, upon hearing of the diversion to Minsk, Protasevich immediately gave some of his luggage to his girlfriend. In Minsk, Protasevich and his girlfriend were arrested at the passport control. No bomb was found aboard. Belarusian president Alexander Lukashenko's press service announced that he personally ordered the plane redirected to Minsk and sent a Belarusian Air Force MiG-29 fighter aircraft to escort it, however subsequently the International Civil Aviation Organization fact-finding task force determined the MiG-29 was just tasked for communications back-up and did not contact, approach or escort the flight.

Shortly after the landing in Minsk, Protasevich was taken away by Belarusian police. A fellow passenger was reported to have heard Protasevich speak of the possibility of facing the death penalty, which exiled Belarusian opposition leader Sviatlana Tsikhanouskaya warned about the same day. The mass unrest charges against Protasevich could carry a prison sentence of up to fifteen years. He had traveled to Athens to cover a visit by Tsikhanouskaya to the Delphi Economic Forum, an international forum in Greece.

On 19 July 2022, the International Civil Aviation Organization (ICAO) said that the grounding of the flight was illegal and blamed senior Belarusian officials, also condemning Protasevich's arrest, calling the bomb threat "deliberately false".

Detention
The day after the arrest, Belarusian state television released a video of Protasevich, with dark markings on his forehead, in which he stated that he would confess to organizing "mass unrest" and that he did not have health problems, after unconfirmed reports of a heart condition. Protasevich's father said the video appeared forced and his nose seemed to have been broken, while allies of Protasevich, including exiled opposition leader Sviatlana Tsikhanouskaya, said the video "is how Roman looks under physical and moral pressure". The Viasna Human Rights Centre and other Belarusian human rights organizations named Protasevich a political prisoner in a joint statement and demanded his immediate release. Amnesty International called for the release of Protasevich and his girlfriend Sofia Sapega, saying "their arrest is arbitrary and unlawful, and its circumstances are nothing short of horrifying".

The authorities prevented Protasevich's parents and a hired lawyer Inessa Olenskaya from visiting him and obtaining information about his location and medical condition until 27 May. On 25 May, Olenskaya was not allowed to enter SIZO No.1 prison in Minsk and did not get a call back from the Investigative Committee officers. The Minsk branch of the Investigative Committee delayed the process of signing the charging documents, and the SIZO staff later claimed that they did not have Protasevich. On 27 May 2021, his mother held a press conference, calling for medical help to Protasevich. She said she had no information about his location and complained that she could not send him any things or messages via his lawyer.

Olenskaya made a formal complaint to the office of Belarusian Prosecutor-General for being denied access to her client and made a motion for a medical examination of Protasevich. According to Protasevich's grandparents, on 23 May a man visited them, introducing himself as a "Roman's first lawyer" and unsuccessfully asking them to sign a document making him a legal representative of Protasevich. On the evening of 27 May, Olenskaya was allowed to meet with Protasevich, but due to a non-disclosure agreement with authorities, she was not allowed to tell journalists his location or legal status.

On 3 June 2021, another video of Protasevich was aired by Belarus state media in which he, apparently under duress, repeated his "confessions". On 14 June 2021, he appeared again in public at a news conference in Minsk to repeat that he felt fine and had not been beaten.

On 25 June 2021, Protasevich and his partner Sapega were transferred to house arrest. Investigators stated the pair had agreed to a plea deal in which they will "expose their accomplices and do their best to compensate for the damage they caused".

Allegedly, Protasevich was provided an internet connection on 7 July 2021 and he created a Twitter account, stating he was staying with Sapega in a private house with a courtyard outside the city and that no one had beaten him. According to Reuters, journalists were "unable to verify whether the account belonged to Protasevich or whether he was drafting his comments unassisted".

On 18 August 2021, his Twitter posts stopped. The last contact his parents had with him was via Sapega by phone in October 2021.

Arrest of Sofia Sapega
Protasevich's girlfriend Sofia Sapega was also arrested on Ryanair Flight 4978. She was remanded in custody for two months. According to the Russian Ministry of Foreign Affairs, Sapega was accused of breaking Belarusian law in August and September 2020; the ministry did not specify which laws she allegedly broke. In a video released by Belarusian authorities, Sapega claimed that she was an editor of Black Book of Belarus, a Telegram channel which had published personal information of security officials that Belarus has classified as an extremist group.

Sapega's mother and several of her classmates told BBC News that she was not involved in the 2020–2021 Belarusian protests, and had been living in Vilnius since August 2020. Sapega's mother was not allowed to visit her daughter in prison.

In a 26 May 2021 speech in the Belarusian parliament, President Alexander Lukashenko labelled Protasevich and Sapega "agents of Western intelligence". On 4 June 2021, the chairman of Investigative Committee of the Belarusian KGB said that Sofia Sapega was charged of "inciting hatred" and "mass disorder".

On 3 December 2021, Sapega was finally charged with "inciting hatred", facing up to six to twelve years of imprisonment.

On 6 May 2022, Sapega was sentenced to six years in prison for "inciting social hatred". Her lawyer said that he would appeal directly to Russian president Vladimir Putin because Sapega is a Russian citizen.

Forced confessions 

The day after the forced Ryanair landing, Belarusian authorities issued a video in which Protasevich claimed he had been treated correctly and not been harmed, though he looked visibly stressed. On 3 June, Belarusian state TV broadcast an interview with Protasevich in which he confessed to organizing mass unrest in the country and named his associates. His family believed the confession was made under duress. Independent experts noticed numerous marks apparently caused by physical force on his hands and a state of mental breakdown.

Azov Battalion allegations 
Belarusian media accused Protasevich of fighting alongside the Ukrainian Azov Battalion. According to the BBC, the "pro-Lukashenko press in Belarus has portrayed the dissident journalist as an extremist with right-wing sympathies". Protasevich said in 2020 that he had spent a year in Ukraine covering the war in Donbas as a freelance photojournalist. Azov Battalion founder Andriy Biletsky wrote about Protasevich, "Roman was indeed together with Azov and other military units that fought against the occupation of Ukraine, though his weapon as a journalist wasn't an automatic rifle but the written word", and that he was wounded at the 2015 Shyrokyne standoff.

Luhansk People's Republic, an unrecognized breakaway polity and participant in the war in Donbas, accused Protasevich of having been a member of the Azov Battalion and having "committed a number of particularly serious crimes, which manifested themselves in the shelling of Donetsk People's Republic settlements, which caused the death and injury of civilians, destruction and damage to civilian infrastructure." The Luhansk People's Republic opened a criminal case against Protasevich and asked for his extradition from Belarus. Belarusian President Alexander Lukashenko said he was not opposed to Protasevich being interrogated by investigators from the rebel republics involved in the Donbas war against Ukraine, as long as it happened on Belarusian soil. On 16 June 2021, representatives of the Luhansk People's Republic declared that Roman Protasevich had been "interrogated". The Ukrainian embassy in Minsk asked Belarusian authorities for an official explanation.

References

Further reading 
 
 

1995 births
Living people
Belarusian democracy activists
Belarusian dissidents
Belarusian photographers
Belarusian State University alumni
Belarusian expatriates in Poland
Imprisoned journalists
Journalists from Minsk
Belarusian political prisoners
Political prisoners according to Viasna Human Rights Centre
Pro-Ukrainian people of the war in Donbas
Radio Free Europe/Radio Liberty people
Victims of aviation accidents or incidents in Belarus